Sancaklı is a village in Karşıyaka district of İzmir Province, Turkey. (Karşıyaka is an intracity district of İzmir.) The population of the village is 147 as of 2011. Main economic activity of the village is animal breeding and dairying . Beekeeping is also promoted.

References

Villages in İzmir Province
Karşıyaka District